is a small Apollo near-Earth asteroid discovered on 16 February 2021 by the Pan-STARRS 1 survey at Haleakala Observatory, Hawaii. On 4 March 2021 at 8:59 UTC, it passed  from Earth. During the close approach, it trailed across the Northern Hemisphere sky and brightened up to apparent magnitude of 14.6. The asteroid's spin axis is unusually oblique relative to its orbital plane, contrary to predictions from the YORP effect.

References

External links 
 Near-Earth asteroid 2021 DW1 very close encounter: an image – 03 Mar. 2021, Gianluca Masi, Virtual Telescope Project, 4 March 2021
 
 
 

Minor planet object articles (unnumbered)
20210216
20210216